Methylohalobius crimeensis is a moderately halophilic, methanotrophic bacterium, the type species of its genus. It is Gram-negative, aerobic, non-pigmented, motile, coccoid to spindle-shaped, with type strain 10KiT (=DSM 16011T =ATCC BAA-967T).

References

Further reading

Singh, Om V. Extremophiles: Sustainable Resources and Biotechnological Implications. John Wiley & Sons, 2012. 
Seckbach, Joseph, and Aharon Oren, eds. Microbial mats: modern and ancient microorganisms in stratified systems. Vol. 14. Springer, 2010.

External links

LPSN
Type strain of Methylohalobius crimeensis at BacDive -  the Bacterial Diversity Metadatabase

Gammaproteobacteria